Simon Patrick Bowes-Lyon, 19th and 6th Earl of Strathmore and Kinghorne (born 18 June 1986), is a 
Scottish peer and landowner, the owner of estates based at Glamis Castle. He is also 17th Viscount Lyon, 19th Lord Lyon and Glamis, 26th Lord Glamis, 17th Lord Glamis, Tannadyce, Sidlaw and Strathdichtie, and 7th Baron Bowes, and from birth until 2016 was known as Lord Glamis.

The eldest son of Michael Bowes-Lyon, 18th Earl of Strathmore and Kinghorne, and his first wife, Isobel Weatherall, he is a second cousin once removed of King Charles III, whose maternal grandmother was a Bowes-Lyon.

He is chieftain of the Strathmore Highland Games.

In 2021, Lord Strathmore pleaded guilty to sexually assaulting a woman at his ancestral home, Glamis Castle, and as a result served five months in prison.

Biography
Strathmore was born on 18 June 1986 into the Bowes-Lyon family. His father, Michael Bowes-Lyon, 18th Earl of Strathmore and Kinghorne, was a politician, soldier, and business man, as well as a hereditary peer. His mother is Isobel Weatherall, daughter of Captain Anthony Edward Weatherall. He attended Sunningdale School. His parents divorced in 2004.

Lord Strathmore is a great-great-nephew of Queen Elizabeth The Queen Mother and thus a second cousin once removed of King Charles III. In 2002, he walked alongside his father and members of the royal family behind the coffin of the Queen Mother during her funeral.

On his father's death on 27 February 2016, the then Lord Glamis succeeded as 19th Earl. In 2019, he was living at Glamis Castle. Running the Glamis estate includes work with Reiver Travel, which arranges exclusive holidays in Scotland. In 2017 Strathmore decided to renovate Glamis House, a property on his estate and a childhood home of the Queen Mother, for use as a self-catering holiday home. From 2016 to 2018, he was a director of Ark Hill Wind Farm Ltd. Lord Strathmore is the chieftain of the Strathmore Highland Games, which takes place annually in the grounds of Glamis Castle.

Controversy

Speeding conviction
He was banned from driving for nine months.

COVID-19 violation
In June 2020, Durham Police contacted the Earl for violating the COVID-19 related travel restrictions then in place. A report said Lord Strathmore travelled  to Holwick Lodge, Middleton-in-Teesdale, and that his butler was spotted buying newspapers.

Sexual assault conviction
In 2021, Lord Strathmore was charged with sexual assault after admitting to attacking a 26-year-old woman at his Scottish home, Glamis Castle, in early 2020. On 12 January 2021, Strathmore was granted bail and placed on the Violent and Sex Offender Register (ViSOR) by Sheriff Alistair Carmichael at Dundee Sheriff Court. His conviction attracted attention in both the British and the international press, due to his connection with the royal family. The Times reported calls for Lord Strathmore to be removed as the Chieftain of the annual Strathmore Highland Games. On 23 February 2021, he was sentenced to ten months' imprisonment and placed on the sex offenders register for 10 years. He was released after serving five
months.

Titles and styles
 18 June 1986 − 27 February 2016: Lord Glamis
 27 February 2016 – present: The Right Honourable The Earl of Strathmore and Kinghorne

In addition to the Earldom of Strathmore and Kinghorne, Strathmore holds the following subsidiary titles: 17th Viscount Lyon, 19th Lord Lyon and Glamis, 26th Lord Glamis, 17th Lord Glamis, Tannadyce, Sidlaw and Strathdichtie, and 7th Baron Bowes, of Streatlam Castle.

References

Living people
1986 births
Earls of Strathmore and Kinghorne
Earls in the Peerage of the United Kingdom
Bowes-Lyon family
Scottish landowners
British people convicted of sexual assault
21st-century Scottish criminals
Prisoners and detainees of Scotland
People educated at Sunningdale School